Cieszyce may refer to:

Cieszyce, Szczecin
Cieszyce, Lower Silesian Voivodeship (south-west Poland)
Cieszyce, West Pomeranian Voivodeship (north-west Poland)